Maungakiekie-Tāmaki is a local government area in Auckland, in New Zealand's Auckland Region. It is governed by the Maungakiekie-Tāmaki Local Board and Auckland Council, and aligns with the council's Maungakiekie-Tāmaki Ward.

Geography

The area is the south-eastern part of the Auckland isthmus. It includes the suburbs of Glen Innes, Point England, Tāmaki, Panmure, Mount Wellington, Westfield, Penrose, Oranga, Onehunga, Southdown and One Tree Hill.

There are several geographic features, including:

 Maungakiekie / One Tree Hill
 Maungarei / Mount Wellington
 Mutukaroa / Hamlins Hill
 Panmure Basin

Features

The local board includes the major retail areas of Panmure, Onehunga and Sylvia Park. Manufacturing, bulk storage and distribution are major employers.

Mt Smart Stadium is also located within the area.

References